Andrija Majdevac (born 7 August 1997) is a Serbian footballer who plays as a forward for Novi Pazar.

Club career
Born in Kruševac, Majdevac passed youth categories of the local club Napredak. After a solid performances for youth team, he made his professional debut for Napredak in Serbian SuperLiga home match against Jagodina on 4 April 2015. First appearance in 2015–16 season, Majdevac made in a cup match against Moravac Mrštane, played on 28 October 2015. Beginning of 2016, media published the information that Genk has expressed interest in him. Majdevac continued playing with the first team in the 2015–16 Serbian First League season, but also stayed with youth selection until the end of season. For the first half of the 2016–17 season, Majdevac was loaned to the Serbian League East side Temnić. At the beginning, he moved to Dinamo Vranje on a loan deal until the end of the 2016–17 Serbian First League season. In summer 2017, he returned to Temnić on six-month loan deal.

Career statistics

Honours
Napredak Kruševac
Serbian First League: 2015–16

References

External links
 Andrija Majdevac stats at utakmica.rs 
 Andrija Majdevac at serbiacorner.com
 
 

1997 births
Living people
Sportspeople from Kruševac
Association football forwards
Serbian footballers
FK Napredak Kruševac players
FK Dinamo Vranje players
FK Temnić players
FK Inđija players
FK Novi Pazar players
Balzan F.C. players
AEL Limassol players
Ethnikos Achna FC players
Serbian First League players
Serbian SuperLiga players
Maltese Premier League players
Cypriot First Division players
Serbian expatriate sportspeople in Malta
Serbian expatriate sportspeople in Cyprus
Expatriate footballers in Malta
Expatriate footballers in Cyprus